Tennessee Christian Preparatory School (TCPS), formerly Tennessee Christian Academy (TCA) is a private Christian college preparatory school located in Cleveland, Tennessee. It is the only state-accredited private college preparatory school in the immediate area.

History 

TCPS was founded in 1997 by a group of parents committed to Christian education. When initially founded, the school was named Tennessee Christian Academy. In 2008, school administrators increased academic rigor, tightened admissions policies and began to focus on providing college-preparatory education for all students. It was at this time that the school took on its current name, Tennessee Christian Preparatory School. In 2015, TCPS was the only private school in Tennessee to be recognized as a National Blue Ribbon School of Excellence.

Campus 

Currently, TCPS leases its campus on the former site of Tomlinson College of the Church of God of Prophecy. As the Church of God of Prophecy has announced plans to revive their college on the campus, TCPS has acquired property for a new campus.

Extracurricular Activities

Athletics

Tennessee Christian Preparatory School offers several sports that compete at the varsity level including soccer, cross-country, baseball, basketball, volleyball and golf.

References

Christian schools in Tennessee
Educational institutions established in 1997
Private K-12 schools in Tennessee
Nondenominational Christian schools in the United States
Education in Bradley County, Tennessee
1997 establishments in Tennessee